Humanoid is the third German studio album, the second English studio album and the fourth overall studio album by German band Tokio Hotel. Released through Island Records and Cherrytree Records, the album was recorded in both German and English with both versions set for a simultaneous worldwide release bearing the same title, Humanoid. The German version of the album was released on October 2, 2009, in Germany and other European countries, while the English version was released in the United States on October 6, 2009. Unlike their previous English-language album, Scream, Humanoid had no UK release in 2009. Humanoid was digitally released on UK iTunes on January 27, 2014.

The first single, "Automatisch" was released on September 18, 2009, and "Automatic" was released on September 22, 2009, in the US.

The song "Human Connect To Human" was featured in a Verizon Wireless commercial promoting Motorola's Droid phone. "Humanoid" is included on the set list for rhythm game Rock Band 3.

Background
After the North American mini-tours in 2008, the band returned to their studio in Hamburg to record the album. The band worked with many different producers in the process including the Matrix,  Guy Chambers and Desmond Child (who worked on an album with the same theme for Scorpions). In total, 25 songs were recorded for the album with originally 13 making the final track listing. But when the track listing for both versions were released, it was found that 12 tracks would be on the standard versions while 16 tracks would be on the deluxe versions.

The album title, Humanoid, is a word derived from science fiction which means 'human like'. Producer David Jost had explained the reasoning behind the album title to an interview with MTV:  
On June 17, 2009, short versions of two of the new English songs, "Dark Side of the Sun" and "Pain of Love", were leaked on the Internet. It was confirmed to be from Tokio Hotel and it would be on the album. On that same day, after the confirmation, every possible video on YouTube containing these two demos had been taken down due to copyright restrictions.
Later, in August, three full version songs were leaked, "Love & Death", "Pain of Love" and "Dark Side of the Sun". The songs were then also removed from any media site that the songs were put up on, but now the songs can be found on YouTube or on fan blogs.

On July 21, 2009, Nokia.de told the public that they had signed a deal with Tokio Hotel to become the new face of Nokia. In return, Tokio Hotel got a poster campaign and an unplugged performance which was held on August 27 in Cologne, Germany and tickets were available through a contest. The mini-concert consisted of 6 songs: 5 known hits and the premier of the first single taken from the album, "Automatisch".

On August 9, it was announced that the first single from the album would be "Automatisch" in German and "Automatic" in English. On August 20, MTV Buzzworthy released a video which previewed "Automatic" and Cherrytree Records announced that the English version of the song would be released in the US on September 22. The video for the single(s) was released on September 3. Upon the album's artwork being unveiled, MTV News likened its cover to the alternate artwork of Janet Jackson's "Feedback."

On November 5, the band performed the song "World Behind My Wall" at the 2009 MTV Europe Music Awards. This is the second single from the album, along with "Lass Uns Laufen".

The Music Video for "Dark Side Of The Sun" was released on their website on June 24, 2010. This is said to be the third single from the album, but there is currently no German version (Sonnensystem) available. The music video is a collaboration of concert videos, clips and footage with, for the first time in all of Tokio Hotel's singles, audio being taken from an actual live performance instead of a studio take.

Reception

Initial critical response to Humanoid was mixed. At Metacritic, which assigns a normalized rating out of 100 to reviews from mainstream critics, the album has received an average score of 57, based on four reviews.

Track listing
Credits adapted from the liner notes of Humanoid.

Personnel

Performance credits
 Bill Kaulitz – lead vocals
 Tom Kaulitz – guitar, piano, backing vocals
 Georg Listing – bass guitar, keyboards, backing vocals
 Gustav Schäfer – drums, percussion, backing vocals
Strings on "Sonnensystem"
 Violin and viola – Stefan Pintev, Rodrigo Reichel, Dana Matchin
 Cello – Boris Matchin

 Production
Executive Producers: Patrick Benzner, Dave Roth, David Jost, Peter Hoffman
Co-producers: Bill Kaulitz and Tom Kaulitz
Management: David Jost and Benjamin Ebel

Release history

Charts

Certifications

References 

2009 albums
Tokio Hotel albums